Oss is a railway station located in Oss, Netherlands. The station was opened on 4 June 1881 and is located on the Tilburg–Nijmegen railway. The train services are operated by Nederlandse Spoorwegen.

Train services
The following services currently call at Oss:
2x per hour intercity services Zwolle - Deventer - Arnhem - Nijmegen - Oss - 's-Hertogenbosch - Roosendaal
2x per hour local services (sprinter) Nijmegen - Oss - 's-Hertogenbosch - Boxtel - Eindhoven - Helmond - Deurne
2x per hour local services  (sprinter) Oss - 's-Hertogenbosch (peak service in peak direction).

Bus services
There is a bus station outside the station. The following buses call at the station:
City Community Bus: 1, 2
Bravo Regional Bus: 90, 96, 157
Bravo Direct Express Bus: 305
neighborhood bus 262, 294, 296, 662.

Trivia
In the Netherlands, Oss is the country's shortest station name.

References

External links
NS website 
Dutch Public Transport journey planner 

Railway stations in Oss
Railway stations opened in 1881
1881 establishments in the Netherlands
Railway stations in the Netherlands opened in the 19th century